The Prayer Book Rebellion or Western Rising was a popular revolt in Cornwall and Devon in 1549.  In that year, the Book of Common Prayer, presenting the theology of the English Reformation, was introduced. The change was widely unpopular, particularly in areas where  firm Catholic religious loyalty (even after the Act of Supremacy in 1534) still existed, such as Lancashire. Along with poor economic conditions, the enforcement of the English language literature rather than Cornish led to an explosion of anger in Cornwall and Devon, initiating an uprising. In response, Edward Seymour, 1st Duke of Somerset sent John Russell to suppress the revolt, with the rebels being defeated and its leaders executed two months after the beginning of hostilities.

Background

One probable cause of the Prayer Book Rebellion was the religious changes recently implemented by the government of the new king, Edward VI. In the late 1540s, Lord Protector Somerset, on behalf of the young king, introduced a range of legislative measures as an extension of the Reformation in England and Wales, with the primary aim of changing theology and practices, particularly in areas of traditionally Catholic religious loyalty – for example, in Cornwall and Devon.

When traditional religious processions and pilgrimages were banned, commissioners were sent out to remove all symbols of Catholicism, in line with Thomas Cranmer's religious policies favouring Protestantism ever more. In Cornwall, this task was given to William Body, whose perceived desecration of religious shrines led to his murder on 5 April 1548 by William Kylter and Pascoe Trevian at Helston.

This pressure on the lower classes was compounded by the recent poll tax on sheep. This would have affected the region significantly, with the West Country being an area of sheep farming. Rumours circulating that the tax would be extended to other livestock might have increased the discontent.

A damaged social structure then meant this local uprising was not sufficiently dealt with by nearby landowners. The Marquess of Exeter, a large landowner in Sampford Courtenay, had recently been attainted. His successor, Lord Russell, was based in London and rarely came out to his land. It is possible this created a lack of local power that would have normally been expected to quell the revolt.

It is possible that the roots of the rebellion can be traced back to Cornwall's own ancient wish for independence from England, meaning they were loath to accept new laws from a central government geographically distant from them. More recently, the Cornish Rebellion of 1497 and the subsequent destruction of monasteries from 1536 through to 1545 under King Henry VIII had brought an end to the formal scholarship, supported by the monastic orders, that had sustained the Celtic Cornish and the Catholic Devonian cultural identities. The dissolution of Glasney College and Crantock College as well as Tavistock Abbey in Devon played a significant part in fomenting opposition to future cultural reforms. It has been argued that the Catholic Church had "proved itself extremely accommodating of Cornish language and culture" and that government attacks on the traditional religion had reawakened the spirit of defiance in Cornwall, and in particular the majority Cornish-speaking far west.

Immediate retribution followed with the execution of twenty-eight Cornishmen at Launceston Castle. One execution of a "traitor of Cornwall" occurred on Plymouth Hoe – town accounts gave details of the cost of timber for both gallows and poles. Martin Geoffrey, the pro-Catholic priest of St Keverne, near Helston, was taken to London. After Geoffrey's execution, his head was impaled on a staff erected upon London Bridge as was customary.

Sampford Courtenay and the immediate beginnings of the uprising

The new prayer book was not uniformly adopted and in 1549, the Act of Uniformity made it unlawful to use the Latin liturgical rites from Whitsunday 1549 onwards. Magistrates were given the task of enforcing the change. Following the enforced change on Whitsunday, on Whitmonday the parishioners of Sampford Courtenay in Devon compelled their priest to revert to the old service. The rebels argued that the new English liturgy was "but lyke a Christmas game." This claim was probably related to the book's provision for men and women to file into the quire on different sides to receive the sacrament, which seemed to remind the Devon men of country dancing. Justices arrived at the next service to enforce the change.  An altercation at the service led to a proponent of the change (William Hellyons) killed by being run through with a pitchfork on the steps of the church house.

Following this confrontation, a group of parishioners from Sampford Courtenay decided to march to Exeter to protest at the introduction of the new prayer book.  As the group of rebels moved through Devon, they gained large numbers of Catholic supporters and became a significant force.  Marching east to Crediton, the Devon rebels laid siege to Exeter, demanding the withdrawal of all English liturgies. Although a number of the inhabitants in Exeter sent a message of support to the rebels, the city refused to open its gates.  The gates were to stay closed because of the siege for over a month.

"Kill all the gentlemen"

In Cornwall and Devon, the issue of the Book of Common Prayer proved to be the final indignity that the people could peaceably bear. Two decades of oppression were followed by two years of rampant inflation, in which wheat prices had quadrupled. Along with the rapid enclosure of common lands, the attack on the Church, which was felt to be central to the rural community, led to an explosion of anger.  In Cornwall, an army gathered at the town of Bodmin under the leadership of its mayor, Henry Bray, and two staunch Catholic landowners, Sir Humphrey Arundell of Helland and John Winslade of Tregarrick.

Many of the gentry sought protection in old castles.  Some shut themselves in St Michael's Mount where they were besieged by the rebels who started a bewildering smoke-screen by burning trusses of hay. This, combined with a shortage of food and the distress of women, forced them to surrender. Sir Richard Grenville found refuge in the ruins of Trematon Castle.  Deserted by many of his followers, the old man was enticed outside to parley. He was seized and the castle ransacked. Sir Richard and his companions were imprisoned in Launceston gaol. The Cornish army then proceeded to march east across the Tamar border into Devon to join with the Devon rebels near Crediton.

The religious aims of the rebellion were highlighted in the slogan "Kill all the gentlemen and we will have the Six Articles up again, and ceremonies as they were in King Henry's time." However, it also implies a social cause (a view supported by historians such as Guy and Fletcher).  That later demands included limiting the size of households belonging to the gentry – theoretically beneficial in a time of population growth and unemployment – possibly suggests an attack on the prestige of the gentry.  Certainly such contemporaries as Thomas Cranmer took this view, condemning the rebels for deliberately inciting a class conflict by their demands: "to diminish their strength and to take away their friends, that you might command gentlemen at your pleasures". Protector Somerset himself saw dislike of the gentry as a common factor in all of the 1549 rebellions: "indeed all hath conceived a wonderful hate against the gentlemen and taketh them all as their enemies."

The Cornish rebels were also concerned with the use of the English language in the new prayer book. The language-map of Cornwall at this time is quite complicated, but philological studies have suggested that the Cornish language had been in territorial retreat throughout the Middle Ages. Summarising the research, Mark Stoyle says that by 1450, the county was divided into three main linguistic blocs: "West Cornwall was inhabited by a population of Celtic descent, which was mostly Cornish speaking; the western part of East Cornwall was inhabited by a population of Celtic descent, which had largely abandoned the Cornish tongue in favor of English; and the eastern part of East Cornwall was inhabited by a population of Anglo-Saxon descent, which was entirely English speaking.". This tripartite model is however not borne out by modern genetic evidence which shows distinctly Cornish and Devonian genetic identities separate from, but closely related to, both each other and the 'Anglo-Saxon' English.

The West Cornish, outraged by the introduction of English in their 1549 services, wrote the Demands of the Western Rebels the eighth Article of which states: "...and so we the Cornyshe men (whereof certen of us understande no Englysh) utterly refuse thys newe Englysh". Responding to this, however, Archbishop Cranmer asked why the Cornishmen should be offended by holding the service in English rather than Cornish when they had before held it in Latin and not understood that.

Confrontations

In London, King Edward VI and his Privy Council became alarmed by this news from the West Country. On instructions from the Lord Protector the Duke of Somerset, one of the Privy Councillors, Sir Gawen Carew, was ordered to pacify the rebels. At the same time, Lord John Russell was ordered to take an army to impose a military solution.

The rebels were of many different backgrounds, some farmers, some tin miners, and some fishermen. Cornwall appears to have had a significantly larger militia than other areas of a similar size.

Crediton confrontation
After the rebels passed Plymouth, Devonian knights Sir Gawen and Sir Peter Carew were sent to negotiate with the Devon rebels at Crediton. They found their approaches blocked and they were attacked by longbowmen. Shortly before, the Cornish rebels arrived and Arundell had to divide his combined force, sending one force to Clyst St Mary to assist the villagers and the other with the main army to advance upon Exeter, where it besieged the city for 5 weeks.

The siege of Exeter

The rebel commanders unsuccessfully tried to persuade John Blackaller, Exeter's pro-Catholic mayor, to surrender the town. The city gates were closed as the initial force of some 2,000 men gathered outside.

Battle of Fenny Bridges
On July 2, Lord John Russell, 1st Earl of Bedford's initial force had reached Honiton. It included 160 Italian arquebusiers and 1,000 landsknechts, German foot soldiers, under the command of Lord William Grey. With promised reinforcements from Wiltshire and Gloucestershire, Russell would have had more than 8,600 men, including a cavalry force of 850 men, all of whom were well armed and well trained. Russell had estimated the combined rebel forces from Cornwall and Devon at only 7,000 men. On July 28, Arundell decided to block their approach to Exeter at Fenny Bridges. The result of this conflict was inconclusive. Approximately 300 men on each side were reported to have died with Lord Russell and his army returned to Honiton.

Battle of Woodbury Common
Lord Russell's reinforcements arrived on August 2 and his army of 5,000 men began a march upon Exeter, westward, across the downs. Russell's advance continued on to Woodbury Common where they pitched camp. On August 4, the rebels attacked, but the result was inconclusive with large numbers of prisoners taken by Lord Russell.

Battle of Clyst St Mary
Arundell's forces re-grouped with the main contingent of 6,000 soldiers at Clyst St Mary, but they were attacked by a central force led by Sir William Francis on August 5. After a ferocious battle, Russell's troops gained the advantage and left a thousand Cornish and Devonians dead and many more taken prisoner.

Clyst Heath massacre
Russell pitched camp on Clyst Heath where he had 900 bound and gagged rebel prisoners killed, with their throats slit in 10 minutes, according to the chronicler John Hayward.

Battle of Clyst Heath
When news of the atrocity reached Arundell's forces, a new attack took place early on August 6. Lord Grey later commented that he had never seen the like nor taken part in such a murderous fray. As he had led the charge against the Scots in the Battle of Pinkie Cleugh, this was a telling statement. Some 2,000 soldiers had died at the battle of Clyst Heath. A group of Devon men went north, up the valley of the Exe, where they were overtaken by Sir Gawen Carew who left the corpses of their leaders hanging on gibbets from Dunster to Bath.

Relief of Exeter
Lord Russell continued his attack with the relief of Exeter. In London, a proclamation was issued, allowing the lands of those involved in the uprising to be confiscated. Arundell's estate was transferred to Sir Gawen Carew, and Sir Peter Carew was rewarded with John Winslade's estate in Devon.

Battle of Sampford Courtenay

Lord Russell was under the impression that the rebels had been defeated, but news arrived that Arundell's army was re-grouping at Sampford Courtenay. This interrupted his plans to send 1,000 men into Cornwall by ship to cut off his enemy's retreat. Russell's forces were strengthened by the arrival of a force under Provost Marshal Sir Anthony Kingston. His army now numbered more than 8,000, vastly outnumbering what had remained of his opposition. Lord Grey and Sir William Herbert led the attack, and the contemporary Exeter historian John Hooker wrote that "the Cornish would not give in until most of their number had been slain or captured".  Lord John Russell reported that his army had killed between five and six hundred rebels, and his pursuit of the Cornish retreat had killed a further seven hundred.

Aftermath

Many had escaped, including Arundell who fled to Launceston. There, he was captured and taken to London together with Winslade, who was caught at Bodmin. In total, over 5,500 people lost their lives in the rebellion. Further orders were issued on behalf of the king by the Lord Protector the Duke of Somerset and Archbishop Thomas Cranmer for the continuance of the onslaught. Under Sir Anthony Kingston, the English and mercenary forces had moved into Devon and Cornwall where they executed or killed many people before the bloodshed finally ceased. Proposals to translate the Prayer Book into Cornish were also suppressed.

The loss of life in the Prayer Book Rebellion and subsequent reprisals as well as the introduction of the English Prayer Book is seen as a turning point in the Cornish language, for which – unlike Welsh – a complete bible translation has not been produced. Research has also suggested that, prior to the rebellion, the Cornish language had strengthened and more concessions had been made to Cornwall as a "nation", and that anti-English sentiment had been growing stronger, providing additional impetus for the rebellion.

Bishop of Truro's apology for the response to the Rebellion
In June 2007, the then Bishop of Truro, the Right Revd Bill Ind, was reported as saying that the massacre during the vicious suppression of the Prayer Book Rebellion more than 450 years ago was an "enormous mistake" for which the Church of England should be ashamed. Speaking at a ceremony at Pelynt, he said:

See also
 Cornish Rebellion of 1497
 Buckinghamshire and Oxfordshire Rising of 1549, which took place at the same time and for the same reasons as the Prayer Book Rebellion
 Pilgrimage of Grace
 Rising of the North
 Religion in the United Kingdom
 Jenny Geddes, precipitator of a later rebellion in Scotland leading to the Wars of the Three Kingdoms including the English Civil War
 List of topics related to Cornwall
 History of Devon

References

Bibliography

Primary sources
Holinshed, Raphael (1586) The ... Chronicles, comprising the description and historie of England, the description and historie of Ireland, the description and historie of Scotland; first collected and published by Raphaell Holinshed, William Harrison, and others. Now newlie augmented and continued (with manifold matters of singular note and worthie memorie) to the yeare 1586 by John Hooker, alias Vowell Gent, and others. 3 vols. London: John Harrison, 1586–87 (includes an account of the rebellion by John Hooker)
John Hooker, Description of the citie of Excester, ed. Walter J. Harte, J. W. Schopp and H. Tapley-Soper, (Devon and Cornwall Record Society Publications, vol. 11), 3 pts., Exeter: Devon and Cornwall Record Society, 1919–1947
 Nicholas Pocock, (ed.), Troubles connected with the Prayer Book of 1549, Camden Society, new series, vol. 37, 1884

Secondary sources
 Arthurson,  Ian. "Fear and loathing in west Cornwall: seven new letters on the 1548 rising," Journal of the Royal Institution of Cornwall, new series II, vol. 3, pts. 3/4, 2000, pp. 97–111
 Aston, Margaret,  "Segregation in church," in: W. J. Sheils and Diana Wood, (eds.), Women in the Church, (Studies in Church History, 27), Oxford: Basil Blackwell, 1990, pp. 242–281.
 Beer, B. L. “London and the Rebellions of 1548-1549.” Journal of British Studies, 12.1  1972, pp. 15–38. online
 Charlesworth, Andrew, ed. An atlas of rural protest in Britain 1548-1900 (Taylor & Francis, 2017).
 Cornwall, Julian. The Revolt of the Peasantry, 1549, London: Routledge & Kegan Paul, 1977
 Couratin, A.H. "The Holy Communion, 1549," Church Quarterly Review, vol. 164, 1963, pp. 148–159
 Eamon Duffy, The Voices of Morebath: reformation and rebellion in an English village, New Haven, Conn.; London: Yale University Press, 2001. 
 Fletcher, Anthony, and Diarmaid MacCulloch, Tudor Rebellions, 5th ed., Harlow: Pearson Longman, 2004 (pp. 52–64). 
 Diarmaid MacCulloch, Thomas Cranmer: a life, New Haven, Conn.; London: Yale University Press, 1996 (pp. 429–432, 438–440). 
 Manning, Roger B. "Violence and social conflict in mid-Tudor rebellions," Journal of British Studies, vol. 16, 1977, pp. 18–40
 Mattingly, Joanna. "The Helston Shoemakers Guild and a possible connection with the 1549 rebellion," Cornish Studies, vol. 6, 1998, pp. 23–45
 Rose-Troup, Frances. The western rebellion of 1549: an account of the insurrections in Devonshire and Cornwall against religious innovations in the reign of Edward VI, London: Smith, Elder, 1913 online
 Mark Stoyle. "The dissidence of despair: rebellion and identity in early modern Cornwall," Journal of British Studies, vol. 38, 1999, pp. 423–444
 Mark Stoyle. "‘Fullye Bente to Fighte Oute the Matter’: Reconsidering Cornwall's Role in the Western Rebellion of 1549." English Historical Review 129.538 (2014): 549-577.
 Whittle, Jane. "Peasant Politics and Class Consciousness: The Norfolk Rebellions of 1381 and 1549 Compared." Past and Present 195.suppl_2 (2007): 233–247.
 Youings, Joyce. "The south-western rebellion of 1549," Southern History, vol. 1, 1979, pp. 99–122
 Mark Stoyle A Murderous Midsummer: The Western Rising of 1549, Yale University Press, 2022.

External links

1549 Prayer Book Rebellion
Prayer Book Rebellion March
The Prayerbook Rebellion – Etched in Devon's memories
The Western Rebellion in Devon
Keskerdh Kernow 500
Prayer Book Rebellion
1497 and 1549 Rebellions
Britain's radical past
Lyver Pysadow Kemyn (1980) Portions of the Book of Common Prayer in Cornish

1549 in England
History of Cornwall
History of Devon
Christianity in Cornwall
Christianity in Devon
Tudor rebellions
Cornish nationalism
Counter-Reformation
Military history of Cornwall
Book of Common Prayer
Battles involving the Cornish
Conflicts in 1549
16th-century rebellions
Edward VI of England
Sectarian violence
16th century in Cornwall
16th century in Devon
Catholic rebellions